Angela Anaïs Juana Antolina Rosa Edelmira Nin y Culmell (February 21, 1903 – January 14, 1977;) was a French-born American diarist, essayist, novelist, and writer of short stories and erotica. Born to Cuban parents in France, Nin was the daughter of the composer Joaquín Nin and the classically trained singer Rosa Culmell. Nin spent her early years in Spain and Cuba, about sixteen years in Paris (1924–1940), and the remaining half of her life in the United States, where she became an established author.

Nin wrote journals prolifically from age eleven until her death. Her journals, many of which were published during her lifetime, detail her private thoughts and personal relationships. Her journals also describe her marriages to Hugh Parker Guiler and Rupert Pole, in addition to her numerous affairs, including those with psychoanalyst Otto Rank and writer Henry Miller, both of whom profoundly influenced Nin and her writing.

In addition to her journals, Nin wrote several novels, critical studies, essays, short stories, and volumes of erotica. Much of her work, including the collections of erotica Delta of Venus and Little Birds, was published posthumously amid renewed critical interest in her life and work. Nin spent her later life in Los Angeles, California, where she died of cervical cancer in 1977. She was a finalist for the Neustadt International Prize for Literature in 1976.

Early life
Anaïs Nin was born in Neuilly, France, to Joaquín Nin, a Cuban pianist and composer of Catalan descent, and Rosa Culmell, a classically trained Cuban singer of French descent. Her father's grandfather had fled France during the Revolution, going first to Saint-Domingue, then New Orleans, and finally to Cuba where he helped build that country's first railway.

Nin was raised a Roman Catholic but left the church when she was 16 years old. She spent her childhood and early life in Europe. Her parents separated when she was two; her mother then moved Anaïs and her two brothers, Thorvald Nin and Joaquín Nin-Culmell, to Barcelona, and then to New York City, where she attended high school. Nin would drop out of high school in 1919 at age sixteen, and according to her diaries, Volume One, 1931–1934, later began working as an artist's model. After being in the United States for several years, Nin had forgotten how to speak Spanish, but retained her French and became fluent in English.

On March 3, 1923, in Havana, Cuba, Nin married her first husband, Hugh Parker Guiler (1898–1985), a banker and artist, later known as "Ian Hugo" when he became a maker of experimental films in the late 1940s. The couple moved to Paris the following year, where Guiler pursued his banking career and Nin began to pursue her interest in writing; in her diaries she also mentions having trained as a flamenco dancer in Paris in the mid-to-late 1920s with Francisco Miralles Arnau. Her first published work was a critical 1932 evaluation of D. H. Lawrence called D. H. Lawrence: An Unprofessional Study, which she wrote in sixteen days.

Nin became profoundly interested in psychoanalysis and would study it extensively, first with René Allendy in 1932 and then with Otto Rank. Both men eventually became her lovers, as she recounts in her Journal. On her second visit to Rank, Nin reflects on her desire to be reborn as a woman and artist. Rank, she observes, helped her move back and forth between what she could verbalize in her journals and what remained unarticulated. She discovered the quality and depth of her feelings in the wordless transitions between what she could say and what she could not say.  "As he talked, I thought of my difficulties with writing, my struggles to articulate feelings not easily expressed. Of my struggles to find a language for intuition, feeling, instincts which are, in themselves, elusive, subtle, and wordless."

In the late summer of 1939, when residents from overseas were urged to leave France due to the approaching war, Nin left Paris and returned to New York City with her husband (Guiler was, according to his own wishes, edited out of the diaries published during Nin's lifetime; his role in her life is therefore difficult to gauge). During the war, Nin sent her books to Frances Steloff of the Gotham Book Mart in New York for safekeeping.

In New York, Anaïs rejoined Otto Rank, who had previously moved there, and moved into his apartment. She actually began to act as a psychoanalyst herself, seeing patients in the room next to Rank's. She quit after several months, however, stating: "I found that I wasn't good because I wasn't objective. I was haunted by my patients. I wanted to intercede."  It was in New York that she met the Japanese-American modernist photographer Soichi Sunami, who went on to photograph her for many of her books.

Literary career

Journals
Nin's most studied works are her diaries or journals, which she began writing in her adolescence. The published journals, which span several decades from 1933 onward, provide a deeply explorative insight into her personal life and relationships. Nin was acquainted, often quite intimately, with a number of prominent authors, artists, psychoanalysts, and other figures, and wrote of them often, especially Otto Rank. Moreover, as a female author describing a primarily masculine constellation of celebrities, Nin's journals have acquired importance as a counterbalancing perspective. She initially wrote in French and did not begin to write in English until she was seventeen. Nin felt that French was the language of her heart, Spanish was the language of her ancestors, and English was the language of her intellect. The writing in her diaries is explicitly trilingual; she uses whichever language best expresses her thought.

In the third volume of her unexpurgated journal, Incest, she wrote about her father candidly and graphically (207–15), detailing her adult sexual relationship with him.

Previously unpublished works are coming to light in A Café in Space, the Anaïs Nin Literary Journal, which includes "Anaïs Nin and Joaquín Nin y Castellanos: Prelude to a SymphonyLetters between a father and daughter".

So far sixteen volumes of her journals have been published.  All but the last five of her adult journals are in expurgated form.

Erotic writings

Nin is hailed by many critics as one of the finest writers of female erotica. She was one of the first women known to explore fully the realm of erotic writing, and certainly the first prominent woman in the modern West known to write erotica. Before her, erotica acknowledged to be written by women was rare, with a few notable exceptions, such as the work of Kate Chopin. Nin often cited authors Djuna Barnes and D. H. Lawrence as inspirations, and she states in Volume One of her diaries that she drew inspiration from Marcel Proust, André Gide, Jean Cocteau, Paul Valéry, and Arthur Rimbaud.

According to Volume One of her diaries, 1931–1934, published in 1966, Nin first came across erotica when she returned to Paris with her husband, mother and two brothers in her late teens. They rented the apartment of an American man who was away for the summer, and Nin came across a number of French paperbacks: "One by one, I read these books, which were completely new to me.  I had never read erotic literature in America... They overwhelmed me.  I was innocent before I read them, but by the time I had read them all, there was nothing I did not know about sexual exploits... I had my degree in erotic lore."

Faced with a desperate need for money, Nin, Henry Miller and some of their friends began in the 1940s to write erotic and pornographic narratives for an anonymous "collector" for a dollar a page, somewhat as a joke. (It is not clear whether Miller actually wrote these stories or merely allowed his name to be used.)  Nin considered the characters in her erotica to be extreme caricatures and never intended the work to be published, but changed her mind in the early 1970s and allowed them to be published as Delta of Venus and Little Birds. In 2016, a previously undiscovered collection of erotica, Auletris, was published for the first time.

Nin was a friend, and in some cases lover, of many literary figures, including Miller, John Steinbeck, Antonin Artaud, Edmund Wilson, Gore Vidal, James Agee, James Leo Herlihy, and Lawrence Durrell. Her passionate love affair and friendship with Miller strongly influenced her both sexually and as an author. Claims that Nin was bisexual were given added circulation by the 1990 Philip Kaufman film Henry & June about Miller and his second wife June Miller. The first unexpurgated portion of Nin's journal to be published, Henry and June, makes it clear that Nin was stirred by June to the point of saying (paraphrasing), "I have become June," though it is unclear whether she consummated her feelings for her sexually. To both Anaïs and Henry, June was a femme fataleirresistible, cunning, erotic. Nin gave June money, jewelry, clothes; often leaving herself without money.

Novels and other publications
In addition to her journals and collections of erotica, Nin wrote several novels, which were frequently associated by critics with surrealism. Her first book of fiction, House of Incest (1936), contains heavily veiled allusions to a brief sexual relationship Nin had with her father in 1933: While visiting her estranged father in France, the then-thirty-year-old Nin had a brief incestuous sexual relationship with him. In 1944, she published a collection of short stories titled Under a Glass Bell, which were reviewed by Edmund Wilson.

Nin was also the author of several works of non-fiction: Her first publication, written during her years studying psychoanalysis, was D. H. Lawrence: An Unprofessional Study (1932), an assessment of the works of D.H. Lawrence. In 1968, she published The Novel of the Future, which elaborated on her approach to writing and the writing process.

Personal life
According to her diaries, Vol. 1, 1931–1934, Nin shared a bohemian lifestyle with Henry Miller during her time in Paris. Her husband Guiler is not mentioned anywhere in the published edition of the 1930s parts of her diary (Vol. 1–2) although the opening of Vol. 1 makes it clear that she is married, and the introduction suggests her husband refused to be included in the published diaries. The diaries edited by her second husband, after her death, tell that her union with Miller was very passionate and physical, and that she believed that it was a pregnancy by him that she aborted in 1934.

In 1947, at the age of 44, she met former actor Rupert Pole in a Manhattan elevator on her way to a party. The two ended up dating and traveled to California together; Pole was sixteen years her junior. On March 17, 1955, while still married to Guiler, she married Pole at Quartzsite, Arizona, returning with him to live in California. Guiler remained in New York City and was unaware of Nin's second marriage until after her death in 1977, though biographer Deirdre Bair alleges that Guiler knew what was happening while Nin was in California, but consciously "chose not to know".

Nin referred to her simultaneous marriages as her "bicoastal trapeze". According to Deidre Bair:

In 1966, Nin had her marriage with Pole annulled, due to the legal issues arising from both Guiler and Pole trying to claim her as a dependent on their federal tax returns. Though the marriage was annulled, Nin and Pole continued to live together as if they were married, up until her death in 1977.  According to Barbara Kraft, prior to her death Anaïs had written to Hugh Guiler asking for his forgiveness.  He responded by writing how meaningful his life had been because of her.

After Guiler's death in 1985, the unexpurgated versions of her journals were commissioned by Pole. Six volumes have appeared (Henry and June, Fire, Incest, Nearer the Moon, Mirages, and Trapeze). Pole arranged for Guiler's ashes to be scattered in the same area where Anaïs's ashes were scattered, a place called Mermaid Cove off the Pacific coast. Pole died in July 2006.

Nin once worked at Lawrence R. Maxwell Books, located at 45 Christopher Street in New York City. In addition to her work as a writer,  Nin appeared in the Kenneth Anger film Inauguration of the Pleasure Dome (1954) as Astarte; in the Maya Deren film Ritual in Transfigured Time (1946); and in Bells of Atlantis (1952), a film directed by Guiler under the name "Ian Hugo" with a soundtrack of electronic music by Louis and Bebe Barron. In her later life, Nin worked as a tutor at the International College in Los Angeles.

Death
Nin was diagnosed with cervical cancer in 1974. She battled the cancer for several years as it metastasized, and underwent numerous surgeries, radiation, and chemotherapy. Nin died of the cancer at Cedars-Sinai Medical Center in Los Angeles, California, on January 14, 1977.

Her body was cremated, and her ashes were scattered over Santa Monica Bay in Mermaid Cove. Her first husband, Hugh Guiler, died in 1985, and his ashes were scattered in the cove as well. Rupert Pole was named Nin's literary executor, and he arranged to have new, unexpurgated editions of Nin's books and diaries published between 1985 and his death in 2006. Large portions of the diaries are still available only in the expurgated form. The originals are located in the UCLA Library.

Legacy

The explosion of the feminist movement in the 1960s gave feminist perspectives on Nin's writings of the past twenty years, which made Nin a popular lecturer at various universities; contrarily, Nin dissociated herself from the political activism of the movement. In 1973, prior to her death, Nin received an honorary doctorate from the Philadelphia College of Art. She was also elected to the United States National Institute of Arts and Letters in 1974, and in 1976 was presented with a Los Angeles Times Woman of the Year award.

Philip Kaufman directed the 1990 film Henry & June based on Nin's diaries published as Henry and June: From the Unexpurgated Diary of Anaïs Nin. She was portrayed in the film by actress Maria de Medeiros.

Nin's work directly inspired Madonna when writing the text of her photo book Sex in 1992.

In February 2008, poet Steven Reigns organized Anaïs Nin at 105 at the Hammer Museum in Westwood, Los Angeles. Reigns said: "Nin bonded and formed very deep friendships with women and men decades younger than her. Some of them are still living in Los Angeles and I thought it'd be wonderful to have them share their experiences with [Nin]." Bebe Barron, electronic music pioneer and longtime friend of Nin, made her last public appearance at this event. Reigns also published an essay refuting Bern Porter's claims of a sexual relationship with Nin in the 1930s.

Cuban-American writer Daína Chaviano paid homage to Anaïs Nin and Henry Miller in her novel Gata encerrada (2001), where both characters are portrayed as disembodied spirits whose previous lives they shared with Melisa, the main character—and presumably Chaviano's alter ego—, a young Cuban obsessed with Anaïs Nin.

The Cuban poet and novelist Wendy Guerra, long fascinated with Nin's life and works, published a fictional diary in Nin's voice, Posar desnuda en la Habana (Posing Nude in Havana) in 2012. She explained that "[Nin's] Cuban Diary has very few pages and my delirium was always to write an apocryphal novel; literary conjecture about what might have happened".

On September 27, 2013, screenwriter and author Kim Krizan published an article in The Huffington Post revealing she had found a previously unpublished love letter written by Gore Vidal to Nin. This letter contradicts Gore Vidal's previous characterization of his relationship with Nin, showing that Vidal did have feelings for Nin that he later heavily disavowed in his autobiography, Palimpsest. Krizan did this research in the run up to the release of the fifth volume of Anaïs Nin's uncensored diary, Mirages, for which Krizan provided the foreword.

In 2015, The Erotic Adventures of Anais Nin a documentary film directed by Sarah Aspinall, was released, in which Lucy Cohu portrayed Nin's character.

In 2019, Kim Krizan published Spy in the House of Anaïs Nin, an examination of long-buried letters, papers, and original manuscripts Krizan found while doing archival work in Nin's Los Angeles home. Also that year, Routledge published the book Anaïs Nin: A Myth of Her Own by Clara Oropeza, that analyzes Nin's literature and literary theory through the perspective of mythological studies and depth psychology.

Bibliography

Diaries

 The Early Diary of Anaïs Nin (1914–1931), in four volumes
 The Diary of Anaïs Nin, in seven volumes, edited by herself
 Henry and June: From A Journal of Love. The Unexpurgated Diary of Anaïs Nin (1931–1932) (1986), edited by Rupert Pole after her death
 Incest: From a Journal of Love (1992)
 Fire: From A Journal of Love (1995)
 Nearer the Moon: From A Journal of Love (1996)
 Mirages: The Unexpurgated Diary of Anaïs Nin, 1939–1947 (2013)
 Trapeze: The Unexpurgated Diary of Anaïs Nin, 1947–1955 (2017)
 The Diary of Others: The Unexpurgated Diary of Anaïs Nin, 1955–1966 (2021)
 A Joyous Transformation: The Unexpurgated Diary of Anaïs Nin, 1966–1977 (forthcoming)

Correspondence
 Letters to a friend in Australia (1992)
 A Literate Passion: Letters of Anaïs Nin & Henry Miller (1987)
 Arrows of Longing: Correspondence Between Anaïs Nin & Felix Pollack, 1952–1976 (1998)
 Reunited: The Correspondence of Anaïs and Joaquin Nin, 1933–1940 (2020)
 Letters to Lawrence Durrell 1937–1977 (2020)

Novels
 House of Incest (1936)
 Winter of Artifice (1939)
 Cities of the Interior (1959), in five volumes:
 Ladders to Fire
 Children of the Albatross
 The Four-Chambered Heart
 A Spy in the House of Love
 Seduction of the Minotaur,  originally published as Solar Barque (1958).
 Collages (1964)

Short stories
 Waste of Timelessness: And Other Early Stories (written before 1932, published posthumously)
 Under a Glass Bell (1944)
 Delta of Venus (1977)
 Little Birds (1979)
 Auletris (2016)

Non-fiction
 D. H. Lawrence: An Unprofessional Study (1932)
 The Novel of the Future (1968)
 In Favor of the Sensitive Man (1976)
 The Mystic of Sex: Uncollected Writings: 1930-1974 (1995)

Filmography
Ritual in Transfigured Time (1946): Short film, dir. Maya Deren
Bells of Atlantis (1952): Short film, dir. Ian Hugo
Inauguration of the Pleasure Dome (1954): Short film, dir. Kenneth Anger
Melodic Inversion (1958)
Lectures pour tous (1964)
Anaïs Nin Her Diary (1966)
Un moment avec une grande figure de la littérature, Anaïs Nin, (3 May 1968)
Anaïs Nin at the University of California, Berkeley, (December 1971)
Anaïs Nin at Hampshire College, (1972)
'''Ouvrez les guillemets, (11 November 1974)
Journal de Paris, (21 November 1974)
Anais Nin Observed (1974): Documentary, dir. Robert Snyder

See also

 List of Cuban American writers
 List of Cuban Americans

Citations

Works cited

Further reading
 Oropeza, Clara. (2019) Anaïs Nin: A Myth of Her Own, Routledge 
 
 
 Yaguchi, Yuko. (2022) Anaïs Nin's Paris Revisited The English–French Bilingual Edition (French Edition), Wind Rose-Suiseisha
 Bita, Lili. (1994) "Anais Nin". EI Magazine of European Art Center (EUARCE), Is. 7/1994 pp. 9, 24–30

External links

 The Official Anaïs Nin Blog
 Sky Blue Press Preserving and promoting her literary work.
 Anaïs Nin.com Thinking of Anaïs Nin
 Anaïs Nin Foundation Contact the Anaïs Nin estate for rights and permissions requests
  
 
 Ian Hugo (Nin's husband) 
 Anais Nin's Hideaway Home in Los Angeles (2022-03-21 in The New York Times)

1903 births
1977 deaths
20th-century American non-fiction writers
20th-century American women writers
20th-century diarists
20th-century French essayists
20th-century LGBT people
American diarists
American people of Catalan descent
American writers of Cuban descent
American people of Danish descent
Analysands of Otto Rank
Analysands of René Allendy
Burials at sea
Burials in California
Bisexual women
American bisexual writers
French bisexual writers
Deaths from cancer in California
Deaths from cervical cancer
Former Roman Catholics
French emigrants to the United States
French erotica writers
French novelists
French people of Cuban descent
French people of Catalan descent
French people of Danish descent
French short story writers
People from Neuilly-sur-Seine
People with acquired American citizenship
Polyandry
Women diarists
Women erotica writers
Writers from Paris